James Jorden, born 1954, is an American blogger, journalist and music critic.

Jorden is the founding editor of the e-zine-cum-blog Parterre Box which covers the topic of opera from a queer perspective. Jorden's work with parterre box also includes a podcast, Unnatural Acts of Opera. Parterre Box and Jorden have been featured in numerous media publications, including Opera News magazine, The Advocate, and The New York Times. He is a former web producer for Fox News. Until 2013, he was employed full-time as a legal secretary. After 10 years as a reviewer for Gay City News, Jorden became opera critic for the New York Post in March 2009, succeeding Clive Barnes. In the fall of 2014, Jorden left the Post to write about opera for The New York Observer, He also served as a commentator on the WQXR program Operavore.

References

External links
 Parterre Box
 
 
 

American journalists
American male journalists
American music critics
Opera critics
American bloggers
American male bloggers
American gay writers
1954 births
Living people
Place of birth missing (living people)
American LGBT journalists
New York Post people
The New York Observer people
Fox News people